Ambur is a state assembly constituency in Tirupattur district in Tamil Nadu, India. Its State Assembly Constituency number is 48. It comprises portions of the Vellore and Vaniyambadi taluks and is a part of the Vellore constituency for national elections to the Parliament of India. It was in existence from 1957 to 1971 state elections. It is one of the 234 State Legislative Assembly Constituencies in Tamil Nadu, in India.

Madras State

Tamil Nadu

Election Results

2021

2019 By-election

2016

2011

1971

1967

1962

1957

References 

 

Assembly constituencies of Tamil Nadu
Vellore district